Bass Brook is a stream in Itasca County, in the U.S. state of Minnesota.

Bass Brook was named for its population of bass fish.

See also
List of rivers of Minnesota

References

Rivers of Itasca County, Minnesota
Rivers of Minnesota